Athyrium montanum is a species name, which may refer to:

Athyrium montanum (Lam.) Röhl. ex Spreng., published 1804, for the species now classified as Cystopteris montana
Athyrium montanum (Willd.) Shafer, published 1901, an illegitimate later homonym of the above renaming Asplenium montanum

montanum